The Estadio Max Augustín is a multi-purpose stadium in Iquitos, Peru. It is the home ground of the football (soccer) team Colegio Nacional Iquitos and several other Copa Perú teams from Iquitos and the surrounding region. The stadium holds 24,576 people. It was built in 1942 and renovated in 2005. The stadium has artificial turf, an artificial running track, and was a venue in the 2005 FIFA U-17 World Championship

References

External links
World Stadiums 

Max Agustin
Multi-purpose stadiums in Peru
Buildings and structures in Iquitos